Ross J. Connelly (born April 25, 1952) is the former Executive Vice President and COO of the Overseas Private Investment Corporation.   Prior to OPIC, Connelly worked for Bechtel Corporation; he was an executive (1977) and later a senior principal with Bechtel Investments (1982 - 1991) (which later became the Fremont Group) and the President of Bechtel Energy Resources, Inc. (1991 - 1993).  In 1993, Connelly was elected President of Northgas, a Bechtel joint-venture dedicated to developing natural gas resources in northern Russia.  He held this position until he left Bechtel in 1995.

In 1998, Connelly ran for Maine's first district House of Representatives seat on the Republican ticket and lost to fellow Republican James Longley.  In 2000, Connelly directed the Maine branch of George W. Bush's presidential campaign.  In October 2001, Bush rewarded Connelly by appointing him to serve on the board of OPIC, the government office that provides political insurance to U.S. companies who want to invest in unstable parts of the world.

Since his appointment to the OPIC board, Connelly has traveled to Afghanistan, Russia, Azerbaijan, Serbia, Peru, and the Middle East to promote U.S. overseas investments, in particular the investments of U.S. companies (including Bechtel) in the privatization of foreign oil, power, water, and transportation infrastructures.

Connelly has attracted criticism for his role in OPIC projects and investments which critics say will directly benefit his former employers.  In his tenure at OPIC, Connelly finalized OPIC's $130 million loan to Lima Airport Partners, a joint venture between Bechtel to privatize Jorge Chávez International Airport in Lima.  He has also been involved in OPIC's investments in Serbia, a country where Bechtel has been awarded large highway building contracts.

Connelly earned his bachelor's degree in 1974 from Duke University and his master's degree from Georgetown University's Edmund A. Walsh School of Foreign Service in 1977.  He and his family have lived near Biddeford, Maine, for over 30 years.

References

1952 births
Living people
Bechtel
Duke University alumni
Walsh School of Foreign Service alumni
Overseas Private Investment Corporation officials
American chief operating officers